Arif Yanggi Rahman (born, 20 February 1994) is an Indonesian professional footballer who plays as a winger for Liga 2 club Persipa Pati.

Club career

PSIS Semarang
In second season of 2016 Indonesia Soccer Championship B, Arif Yanggi joined PSIS Semarang together with his teammate in Persip Pekalongan, Iwan Wahyudi. He made his debut against Persekap Pasuruan which ended in a 3-1 win for PSIS Semarang.

Persekat Tegal
He was signed for Persekat Tegal to play in Liga 2 in the 2020 season. This season was suspended on 27 March 2020 due to the COVID-19 pandemic. The season was abandoned and was declared void on 20 January 2021.

Hizbul Wathan FC
In 2021, Arif Yanggi signed a contract with Indonesian Liga 2 club Hizbul Wathan. He made his league debut on 4 October against PSIM Yogyakarta. On 18 October 2021, Arif Yanggi scored his first goal for Hizbul Wathan against Persis Solo in the 65th minute at the Manahan Stadium, Surakarta.

Honours

Club
Semen Padang U-21
 Indonesia Super League U-21: 2014

References

External links
Arif Yanggi Rahman at Liga Indonesia

1994 births
Indonesian footballers
Living people
Association football midfielders
PSIS Semarang players
Persis Solo players
Persik Kediri players
People from Solok
Sportspeople from West Sumatra